Caristanius is a genus of snout moths described by Carl Heinrich in 1956.

Species
Caristanius decoloralis (Walker, 1863)
Caristanius guatemalella (Ragonot, 1888)
Caristanius minimus Neunzig, 1977
Caristanius pellucidella (Ragonot, 1888)
Caristanius tripartitus Neunzig, 1996
Caristanius veracruzensis Neunzig, 2004

References

Phycitinae
Pyralidae genera
Taxa named by Carl Heinrich